Berrytown is an unincorporated community located in Kent County, Delaware, United States. Berrytown is located west of Felton, and is connected by Delaware Route 12 (Burnite Mill Road).

References

Unincorporated communities in Kent County, Delaware
Unincorporated communities in Delaware